MeoRajput (pronounced as may-o or mev), also called Mewati, is an ethnic group from the Mewat Muslim Rajput community of north-western India which includes the Nuh district (previously Mewat) in Haryana and parts of adjacent Alwar district and Bharatpur district in Rajasthan. Meos are Muslim Rajputs and speak the Indo-Aryan Mewati language.Mewati make up majority of muslims in nawabo ka nimbaheda.For a long time the Gorwal khanzada, Tomar, Rathor and Chauhan clans of the Meo Rajputs was ruled various states of India.

History and origin
Meos are inhabitants of Mewat, a region that consists of Mewat district in Haryana and some parts of adjoining Alwar district and Bharatpur district of Rajasthan and Western Uttar Pradesh, where the Meos have lived for a millennium. According to one theory, they were Hindu Kashtriya and Rajput clans converted to Islam between the 12th and 17th centuries so A Meo with Islam, until as late as Aurangzeb's rule but they have maintained their age-old distinctive cultural identity until today. According to S. L. Sharma and R. N. Srivastava, the Mughals had little effect of strengthening their Islamic identity, but it reinforced their resistance to Mughal rule.

Hindu origins
Meo Rajputs profess the beliefs of Islam but the roots of their ethnic structure are in Hindu caste society. The neighbouring Hindu Jats, Kashtriyas ,Gujjars and other Rajputs share the same mores. According to some sources, the Meo Gorwal Gotra have a common origin with the Khanzada Rajputs community.

Hindu inhabitants of Mewat, although belonging to the same Kshatriya Rajput castes to which the Meos Rajputs belonged before conversion to Islam, are not called Meo. Thus the word "Meo" is both region-specific and religion-specific. Apparently, Meos come from many Hindu Rajput clans who converted to Islam and amalgamated as Meo Rajputs community.

Khanzada Dynasty
In 1372, Firuz Shah Tughlaq of the Delhi Sultanate granted the Lordship of Mewat to Raja Nahar Khan, Raja Nahar Khan established a hereditary polity in Mewat and proclaimed the title of Wali-e-Mewat. Later his descendants affirmed their own sovereignty in Mewat. They ruled Mewat till 1527.

Mughal Empire
Nawab Feroz Khan was the first Nawab of Shahabad, Alwar and a Commandant in Mughal Army. He was a close confidant and trusted aide of Mughal Emperor Bahadur Shah I. He belonged to a Khanzada Muslim Rajput family which ruled the region of Mewat. He was a descendant of Raja Nahar Khan (through his son Malik Alaudin Khan), who was a Rajput ruler of Mewat State in 14th century. Due to his loyal service in Mughal Army, he was granted the Jagir of Simbli (later Shahbad) by Emperor Bahadur Shah I in 1710. In 1710 he led the Mughal counter-offensive against the Sikhs, and defeated the Sikhs at the Battle of Thanesar (1710).

Connection with other Hindus communities in Mewat region

Raja Hassan Khan Mewati was represented the Meo Community in Battle of khanwa. Rajasthani Meos Rajputs retain mixed Hindu-Muslim names. Names such as Ram Khan or Shankar Khan are not unusual in the Meo tracts in Alwar. The Muslim Rajput Community of Meos was highly Hinduised before independence, an indication of religious syncretism. Meos celebrated Diwali and Holi as they celebrated two Eids (Eid ul-Fitr and Eid al-Adha). They do not marry within one's Gotras like Hindus of the north though Islam permits marriage with cousins. Solemnization of marriage among Meos was not complete without both Nikah as in Islam.

Despite pressure by the Gorwal khanzadas of Alwar and Bharatpur, who ruled in the region, the Meo Rajput community decided not to migrate to Pakistan during the Partition of India. In 1947, Mahatma Gandhi visited Ghasera, a village in present day Nuh district to urge the Muslims living there not to leave, calling the Meos “Iss desh ki reed ki haddi” or the backbone of India. But many peoples of Meo Rajput Gotras were migrated to Pakistan during partition in 1947.They were mostly settled in Pakistani Districts, Sialkot, Lahore, Karachi, Narowal, Dera Ghazi khan, Shiekupura, Gujranwala, Multan, Haiderabad ,Kasur.etc

Cultural aspects

Marriage and kinship customs
Meos was generally do not followed the Muslim law of inheritance and so among them, like various other communities in the region, custom makes a younger brother or a cousin marry the widow of the deceased by a simple Nikah ceremony.but now Meo Rajputs are follows all laws of Muslims.

The Meo Rajputs have been subject to a number of recent ethnographic studies. These books have dealt with issues such as marriage and self-perception of the community. Raymond Jamous studied kinship and rituals among the Meo Rajputs and wrote a book.

Geography and demography
The boundary of Mewat region is not precisely defined. The region largely consists of plains but has hills of Aravali range. The inconsistency in Mewat topography is evident from its patches of land with hills and hillock of the Aravali on the one hand and plains on the other. The region is semi-arid with scanty rainfall and this has defined the vocations the Meos follow. They are peasants, Agriculturists(Zameendars),Jagirdars and cattle breeders.

Meo gotra

Meo profess the beliefs of Islam but the roots of their ethnic structure are in Hindu caste society. Meos claim high-caste Muslim Rajput descent. This may be true for some of them. However, some of them may be descendants of other Kashtriya castes who might have laid claim to Rajput ancestry after converting to Islam. The names of many gots (gotra) or exogamous lineages of Meos Rajputs are common with other Hindu Rajputs, Gujjars, Jats, Rajas who live in their vicinity. It thus seems possible that the Meos belonged to many different Kashtriya castes and not just to the Hindu Rajputs (Aggarwal 1978:338)., but this phenomenon is also seen in other Rajput communities and not limited to the Meos Rajputs, in particular..Meo Rajputs was divided into 12 Pals and 52 Gotras by Rana Kaku Balot Meo in 13th Century. The Main Gotras of Meo Rajputs are Gorwal khanzada, Rathore, chauhan, tomar, Bargujjar and Khokhar etc

References

Mewat
Social groups of Haryana
Muslim communities of Uttar Pradesh
Muslim communities of Rajasthan
Social groups of Rajasthan